The First Congress of the National Christian Party was held between 6–8 December 1945. The congress was the first congress of the party, held in one month after the formation on November 10, 1945. The congress was only attended by the party delegates from Java.

The congress decided to change the name of the party from National Christian Party to Indonesian Christian Party. A permanent central executive committee of the party was formed.

Background 
Prior to the congress, the National Christian Party was established in a meeting of Christian figures on 10 November 1945. The party was intended to accommodate the political views of both Catholics and Protestants in Indonesia, but the Catholic delegation seceded from the party, and formed the Catholic Party on 12 December 1945. The meeting also choose the temporary executive committee of the party, with Wilhelmus Zakaria Johannes as the chairman and Maryoto as the secretary.

Congress 
The congress was opened on 5.00 with a praying ceremony at the Margoyudan Church, led by Ds. Reksohatmodjo. After the opening ceremony, party delegates from different regions of Java begin to attended the congress until 12.00. The delegates were lodged at the Indonesian Christian Party Hall in Kartisono Street.

Notes

References

Bibliography 
 
 

Indonesian Christian Party
Political conferences